Siladon is a small Village/hamlet in Khunti Block in Khunti District of Jharkhand State, India. It comes under Ganeor Panchayath. It is located south of District headquarters Khunti and 30 km from State capital Ranchi.

History
Siladon is the pont of strategic importance as it serves the purpose of meeting point for many nearby places.

Geography

Transport

Road
Siladon is well connected to the State capital Ranchi through village road.

Railways
There is no railway station near to Ganeor in less than 10 km. However Hatia railway station is major railway station 29 km near to Siladon .

Siladon Market
Siladon bazar is the main market for nearby people from village for the purpose of lively hood and earning. 
Hastshilpa Swabalambi Sahakari Samiti, Siladon is one of the important place for Lac goods manufacturing

References

Villages in Khunti district